Delanoë is a Francophone surname derived from "de la noue" meaning "from the mud", and may refer to:

Bertrand Delanoë (b. 1950), French politician and former mayor of Paris
Pierre Delanoë (1918–2006), French songwriter

See also

 Delano (disambiguation)

fr:Delanoë